Enfield is a single-member electoral district for the South Australian House of Assembly. Named after the suburb of the same name, it is a  suburban electorate in Adelaide's inner north, taking in the suburbs of Blair Athol, Broadview, Clearview, Enfield, Kilburn, Lightsview, Northgate, and Sefton Park; and parts of Nailsworth, Northfield and Prospect. The seat was vacant pending a by-election in February 2019—Labor MP John Rau resigned from parliament in December 2018, following Labor's defeat at the 2018 South Australian state election in March. Labor's Andrea Michaels was elected as Rau's successor on 9 February after defeating Independent candidate Gary Johanson in the by-election.

Enfield was first created to replace the abolished electoral district of Prospect for the 1956 election. It was abolished for the 1970 election, substantially replaced by the new electorate of Ross Smith.

Enfield was recreated for the 2002 election as a safe Labor electorate, replacing the abolished electorate of Ross Smith, and was won by Labor candidate John Rau. Rau had defeated Ralph Clarke, the former member for Ross Smith, in a Labor preselection ballot. Clarke subsequently contested the election as an independent, but came third, falling 800 votes short of the Liberal candidate. At the 2006 election, Clarke decided to contest a South Australian Legislative Council seat, for which he had very little chance of success. Without competition from Clarke, Rau extended his margin, easily retaining the electorate for Labor.

In the 2016 redistribution by the electoral districts boundaries commission, the districts southern suburbs of Collinswood and Manningham were reassigned to the neighbouring districts of Adelaide and Torrens. The districts western suburbs of Regency Park, Ferryden Park, Angle Park and Mansfield Park were reassigned to the adjacent district of Croydon. The northeastern boundary was extended to include the suburbs of Northgate, Lightsview and part of Northfield within Enfield district, and the southwestern boundary was shifted south slightly to include part of Prospect.

In both of its incarnations, Enfield has been a comfortably-safe Labor seat.

Members for Enfield

Election results

Notes

References
 ECSA profile for Enfield: 2018
 ABC profile for Enfield: 2018
 Poll Bludger profile for Enfield: 2018

Electoral districts of South Australia
1956 establishments in Australia
1970 disestablishments in Australia
2002 establishments in Australia